Nadia Bonfini (born January 28, 1965, in Tarvisio) is an Italian former alpine skier who competed in the 1988 Winter Olympics. Her main discipline was slalom.

Biography 
Bonfini celebrated her first successes at the Junior World Championship 1983 in Sestriere, where she achieved 5th place in slalom and 15th place in giant slalom. In her relatively short World Cup career she reached the podium for the first time on December 15, 1985, with the third place in the slalom of Savognin. On February 9, 1986, she was able to surpass this result with the second place in Vysoké Tatry. She finished 13th in the slalom classification in the 1985/86 season. In the following winter, she managed two more top 10 places before she competed in her last World Cup race on 28 February 1987. In 1986 she became Italian Slalom Champion.

Bonfini had no success at major events: At the 1987 World Championships in Crans-Montana she dropped out in the second slalom round. At the 1988 Olympic Winter Games in Calgary she also never reached the finish line: In slalom she was eliminated in the second run, in giant slalom she was disqualified after the first run.

Successes

World Cup 
 2 podium positions

Junior World Championship 
 Sestriere 1983: 5th Slalom, 15th Giant Slalom

Italian Championships 
 1986: Italian Slalom Champion

References

External links
 

1965 births
Living people
Italian female alpine skiers
Olympic alpine skiers of Italy
Alpine skiers at the 1988 Winter Olympics
Universiade medalists in alpine skiing
Universiade gold medalists for Italy
Competitors at the 1985 Winter Universiade